Uezwil is a municipality in the district of Bremgarten in the canton of Aargau in Switzerland.

History
In 1936, a 4,500-year-old megalith dating from the Neolithic Age was discovered. Roman finds point to human habitation in the area during the classical period. Around 500, a settlement of Alamanni developed in the area. A village of this name was first documented in 1306 in a Habsburg land deed.

Geography
Of this area, 65.8% is used for agricultural purposes, while 28.4% is forested. The rest of the land, (5.8%) is settled.

Coat of arms
The blazon of the municipal coat of arms is Per pale Or three Arrows Gules in pale fesswise issuant and Azure.

Demographics
, 8.4% of the population was made up of foreign nationals. Over the last 10 years (1997–2007) the population has changed at a rate of 13.9%. Most of the population speaks German (97.5%), with English being second most common ( 0.8%) and French being third ( 0.6%).

The age distribution, in Uezwil is; 51 children or 12.4% of the population are between 0 and 9 years old and 48 teenagers or 11.7% are between 10 and 19.  Of the adult population, 41 people or 10.0% of the population are between 20 and 29 years old.  58 people or 14.1% are between 30 and 39, 85 people or 20.6% are between 40 and 49, and 56 people or 13.6% are between 50 and 59.  The senior population distribution is 45 people or 10.9% of the population are between 60 and 69 years old, 21 people or 5.1% are between 70 and 79, there are 6 people or 1.5% who are between 80 and 89,and there is 1 person who is 90 and older.

  , there were 7 homes with 1 or 2 persons in the household, 39 homes with 3 or 4 persons in the household, and 78 homes with 5 or more persons in the household.  The average number of people per household was 2.72 individuals.   there were 105 single family homes (or 64.8% of the total) out of a total of 162 homes and apartments.  There were a total of 0 empty apartments for a 0.0% vacancy rate.  , the construction rate of new housing units was 7.9 new units per 1000 residents.

In the 2007 federal election the most popular party was the SVP which received 48.8% of the vote.  The next three most popular parties were the SP (13.1%), the CVP (13%) and the FDP (9%).

In Uezwil about 78% of the population (between age 25-64) have completed either non-mandatory upper secondary education or additional higher education (either university or a Fachhochschule).  Of the school age population, there are 28 students attending primary school in the municipality.

The historical population is given in the following table:

Economy
, Uezwil had an unemployment rate of 1.13%.  , there were 58 people employed in the primary economic sector and about 16 businesses involved in this sector.  6 people are employed in the secondary sector and there are 3 businesses in this sector.  11 people are employed in the tertiary sector, with 6 businesses in this sector.

 there was a total of 199 workers who lived in the municipality.  Of these, 156 or about 78.4% of the residents worked outside Uezwil while 13 people commuted into the municipality for work.  There were a total of 56 jobs (of at least 6 hours per week) in the municipality.  Of the working population, 3.9% used public transportation to get to work, and 60.7% used a private car.

Religion
Of the rest of the population, there was 1 individual who belonged to the Christian Catholic faith.

References

External links

Official website

Municipalities of Aargau